Robert Lansdorp (born November 12, 1938) is an Indonesian-American tennis coach known for working with top-ranked players including Tracy Austin, Pete Sampras, Lindsay Davenport, and Maria Sharapova. Lansdorp is regarded as an expert on groundstrokes, advocating a consistently powerful and flat hitting technique commonly referred to in the tennis world as the "Lansdorp Forehand".

Life and career 
Born in the Dutch East Indies (now Indonesia), Lansdorp settled in California. He rose to international fame in 1979 when his student Tracy Austin became the youngest US Open Women's Singles champion in history at age 16.  He later coached other pros including high-ranked Pete Sampras, Lindsay Davenport, Maria Sharapova, and Eugenie Bouchard. 

Lansdorp received the USTA Lifetime Achievement Award in 2005  and was honored as a Team USA Coaching Legend along with Nick Bollettieri, Jerry Baskin and Jack Sharpe at the inaugural 2013 Team USA Coaching Legend reception in Indian Wells, California.

Controversies 
In 2004, Lansdorp said: "I’ve never received anything from one player. Not even a $500 gift. They’re all multi-millionaires but I’ve never received one thing. And I’m telling you, if Maria doesn’t put a Mercedes convertible in my driveway, I’m going to shoot myself."

In 2013 he publicly criticized the United States Tennis Association's Player Development program under General Manager Patrick McEnroe, saying the 2012 mandate requiring players under the age of ten compete on miniature courts with lightweight green-dot balls is "wrong for the very talented kids."  Sharapova, Monica Seles and the Williams sisters, he noted, were very competitive with standard courts and equipment from age 7.

References

American tennis coaches
People from Semarang
Living people
1938 births